The Volitan is a proposed design for a boat equipped with solar cell panels, which uses both wind and solar energy. The proposed design is lightweight, with a stiff structure made of carbon fiber and epoxy resin and carbon foam core lamination. It also has an ultraviolet resistant coating.

It is designed to be powered by a twin 220 HP/DC electric motor, with two suspended wings to help maneuver the ship. In addition, a hydraulic/servo system located in the wings would activate the Volitan's performance sail system. If built, its dimensions would be around 105 ft, 3 in (length), 24 ft, 8 in (height), 92 ft, 7 in (width with solar body) and 24 ft, 9 in (width at low body).

The design won an honorable mention in the 2007 International Design Awards.

References

Solar car racing